A federation is a state governed under the system of federalism.

Federation may also refer to:

Political science
 Arab Federation of Iraq and Jordan, a short-lived country formed in 1958 from the union of Iraq and Jordan
 Balkan Federation, a left-wing late 19th century project
 Federation of Arab Emirates of the South, an organization of states within the British Aden Protectorate in what would become South Yemen, 1959 to 1962
 Federation of Arab Republics, an attempt to merge Libya, Egypt and Syria in order to create a United Arab state, 1972 to 1977
 Federation of Australia, 1901 – a historical event in the History of Australia
 Federation of Bosnia and Herzegovina, one of the two political entities that compose Bosnia and Herzegovina, in existence since 1994
 Federation of Ethiopia and Eritrea or Ethiopian–Eritrean Federation, a federation of the Ethiopian Empire and Eritrea, 1952 to 1962
 Federation of Malaya an Asian nation that existed from 31 January 1948 until 16 September 1963
 Federation of Nigeria, a predecessor to modern-day Nigeria from 1954 to 1963
 Federation of Rhodesia and Nyasaland, also known as the Central African Federation, an African nation in existence from 1953 to 1963
 Federation of South Arabia, formed from the 15 protected states of the Federation of Arab Emirates of the South, 1962 to 1967
 Mali Federation (Fédération du Mali), a West African federation linking the French colonies of Sénégal and the Sudanese Republic (or French Sudan, the future Mali), 1959 to 1960
 Non-governmental federations, organizations governed by federalism
 Russian Federation, the official name for Russia since 1991
 West Indies Federation, also known as the Federation of the West Indies or the West Indian Federation, a political union of various Caribbean islands that were colonies of the United Kingdom, 1958 to 1962

Fictional federations
 The Earth Federation (Gundam), a fictional governing body of the Universal Century Gundam anime series
 The Federation, the main antagonist from Battle Garegga
 The Federation, a futuristic "US-style" superpower, one of three such powers in the game Elite: Dangerous
 The Federation (Shannara), fictional country from the Shannara series by Terry Brooks
 The Galactic Federation, a fictional organisation featured in the Doctor Who serials The Curse of Peladon and The Monster of Peladon
 The Galactic Federation (Metroid), the main governing body in the Metroid video game series
 The Federation of the Americas, a fictional country from Call of Duty: Ghosts in the Call of Duty video game series
 Terran Federation, the fictional totalitarian government centred on Earth in the British television series Blake's 7
 The Terran Federation (Starship Troopers) and United Citizens' Federation from the novel and film Starship Troopers
 Trade Federation, a galaxy-wide megacorporation in Star Wars
 United Federation of Planets, the fictional federation which encompasses approximately 150 planets in Star Trek

Sports
 Sports federation, sports organization that has a regulatory or sanctioning function
 International Basketball Federation (FIBA), an association of national organizations which governs the sport of basketball worldwide
 World Chess Federation (FIDE), an international chess organization 
 Federation of International Football Associations (FIFA), international soccer organization
 WWE Federation Champion, a world heavyweight wrestling championship
 World Wrestling Federation Entertainment (WWE), an American integrated media and entertainment company 
 Badminton World Federation (BWF) is the badminton international governing body
 International Federation of BodyBuilding & Fitness, an international professional sports governing body for bodybuilding and fitness

Other uses
 American Federation of Labor (AFL), a former national federation of labor unions in the United States
 American Federation of Labor-Congress of Industrial Organizations (AFL–CIO),  the largest federation of unions in the United States 
 World Federation of Exchanges (WFE), international trade association of publicly regulated stock, futures, and options exchanges
 Federation (information technology),  the standardization of information systems, or their means of inter-connection
 WS-Federation, an identity specification
 Federation (novel), a 1994 science fiction novel by Judith and Garfield Reeves-Stevens
 Federation (miniseries), 1998 documentary film about federation of Australia
 The Federation (band), a Bay Area hip-hop collective
 Federation II, a text-based online RPG
 Federation architecture, an Australian architectural style ( – )
 Planned Parenthood Federation of America (PPFA), organization that provides reproductive health care 
 Federation of Damanhur, a community situated in the Piedmont region of northern Italy 
 Solidarity Federation, a political organization in the United Kingdom
 Federation Bells, an artistic installation comprising 39 upturned bells, located in Birrarung Marr, Melbourne
 School federation (England and Wales), a partnership between schools in England and Wales

See also
 The Federation (disambiguation)
 Galactic Federation (disambiguation)
 Federal (disambiguation)
 Federated (disambiguation)
 Federalism (disambiguation)
 Federalist (disambiguation)
 Federal Union (disambiguation)